is a Japanese professional wrestler and actress working for New Japan Pro-Wrestling (NJPW) and World Wonder Ring Stardom under the ring name Kairi (stylized in all caps). She is a former IWGP Women's Champion.

From 2012 to 2017, she wrestled for the Japanese promotion World Wonder Ring Stardom under the ring name . Embodying a "Pirate Princess" persona, she became a one-time World of Stardom Champion, a one-time Wonder of Stardom Champion, a three-time Goddess of Stardom Champion and a four-time Artist of Stardom Champion. She also won the 2015 5-Star GP and the 2016 Goddesses of Stardom Tag League.

In 2017, she signed with WWE, where she adopted the ring name Kairi Sane. She won the inaugural Mae Young Classic tournament the same year, and was then assigned to the NXT brand. She captured the NXT Women's Championship in 2018 and subsequently won the 2018 NXT Year-End Awards for Female Competitor of the Year and for Overall Competitor of the Year. In 2019, she debuted on WWE's main roster, where she became a one-time and the longest reigning WWE Women's Tag Team Champion, along with Asuka as part of The Kabuki Warriors. The team also received 2019 WWE Year-End Award for Women's Tag Team of the Year. In 2020, she returned to Japan to join her husband, and worked as a WWE ambassador and trainer in her native country until December 2021 when her contract expired.

Early life 
Kaori Housako was born on September 23, 1988, in Hikari, Yamaguchi Prefecture, Japan. She has a sister, who is three years older than her. She has an extensive sports background in yachting, competing in intercollegiate and national competitions, while also taking part in world championships with dreams of making it to the Olympics. After graduating from Hosei University with a bachelor's degree in Japanese literature, Housako began pursuing a career in acting. She also did some theater work and one of her performances, where she performed as a professional wrestling villain, was seen by Fuka, the general manager of the World Wonder Ring Stardom promotion, who invited Housako to one of their events. She quickly fell in love with professional wrestling's aspect of combining acting with sports and decided to become a wrestler herself.

Professional wrestling career

World Wonder Ring Stardom (2011–2017) 

Housako started training with Stardom in 2011. On November 14, 2011, she passed her "pro test" and graduated as part of Stardom's third class of trainees, alongside Act Yasukawa, Natsumi Showzuki and Yuuri Haruka. Housako, now working under the ring name "Kairi Hojo", made her debut for Stardom on January 7, 2012, losing to Yuzuki Aikawa. Playing off her yachting background, Hojo was dubbed "Pirate Princess". She quickly became a founding member of the Zenryoku Joshi stable, led by Aikawa. In November 2012, Hojo formed a new tag team with Natsumi Showzuki, with the two finishing second in the 2012 Goddesses of Stardom Tag League. Zenryoku Joshi disbanded in January 2013, when Hojo unsuccessfully challenged her stablemate Yuzuki Aikawa for the Wonder of Stardom Championship. Hojo won her first title on April 29, 2013, at Ryōgoku Cinderella, where she and Showzuki, billed collectively as "Ho-Show Tennyo", defeated Hailey Hatred and Kyoko Kimura for the Goddess of Stardom Championship. Their reign, however, lasted only a month, as they were stripped of the title when Showzuki was sidelined with a cervical spine injury. Showzuki never returned from her injury, instead resigning from Stardom.

On June 23, 2013, Hojo teamed with Kaori Yoneyama and Yuhi to defeat Christina Von Eerie, Hailey Hatred and Kyoko Kimura for the vacant Artist of Stardom Championship. They lost the title to Kimura, Alpha Female and The Female Predator "Amazon" on November 4. In May 2014, Hojo made her Mexican debut by representing Stardom in the DragonMania 9 and Lucha Fan Fest 8 events. In August, Stardom's roster was split in half as part of a storyline rivalry between older wrestlers born in the Shōwa period and younger wrestlers born in the Heisei period. Hojo, having been born in the Shōwa period, aligned herself with the likes of Nanae Takahashi and Miho Wakizawa. On August 10, Hojo regained the Goddess of Stardom Championship, when she and Takahashi defeated Alpha Female and Kyoko Kimura. After an eight-month reign, she was again stripped of the title, when Takahashi was sidelined with an ankle injury.

In February 2015, following an incident between Act Yasukawa and Yoshiko, Hojo was named an intermediary between the wrestlers and management in order to bring the two sides closer. Following the incident, Stardom's top title, the World of Stardom Championship, was declared vacant with a tournament scheduled to determine the new champion. On March 29, Hojo defeated first Kyoko Kimura and then Io Shirai to win the World of Stardom Championship for the first time. After a four-month reign, she lost the title to Meiko Satomura on July 26. Hojo bounced back by winning Stardom's top singles tournament, the 5★Star GP, by defeating Hudson Envy in the finals on September 23. At the end of the year, Hojo was named Stardom's MVP of 2015. In January 2016, Hojo came together with former rivals Io Shirai and Mayu Iwatani to form a new stable. On February 28, 2016, the three, now billed collectively as "Threedom" (a combination of the words "Three" and "Stardom"), defeated Evie, Hiroyo Matsumoto and Kellie Skater to win the Artist of Stardom Championship. In April, Hojo, along with Iwatani and Shirai, traveled to the United States to take part in events held by Lucha Underground and Vendetta Pro Wrestling. On May 15, Hojo won another title, when she defeated Santana Garrett for the Wonder of Stardom Championship, winning the title in her fourth attempt. On August 8, Hojo debuted for the Inoki Genome Federation (IGF), defeating Jungle Kyona at an event in Shanghai. On September 3, Hojo defeated Io Shirai to take over the leadership of the Red Stars block in the 2016 5★Star GP. However, during the match, she suffered a concussion, which forced her to pull out of her remaining tournament. On October 2, Threedom lost the Artist of Stardom Championship to Hana Kimura, Kagetsu and Kyoko Kimura in their third defense.

On November 11, Hojo and Yoko Bito defeated Io Shirai and Mayu Iwatani in the finals to win the 2016 Goddesses of Stardom Tag League. Following the match, Shirai turned on Iwatani and disbanded Threedom. On December 22, Hojo and Bito defeated Kagetsu and Kyoko Kimura to become the new Goddess of Stardom Champions. They lost the title to Hiroyo Matsumoto and Jungle Kyona in their second defense on March 5, 2017. Also in March, it was reported that Hojo had told Stardom's office that she was leaving the promotion for WWE the following month. On March 20, Hojo unsuccessfully challenged Io Shirai for the World of Stardom Championship. On May 6, Hojo, Hiromi Mimura and Konami defeated AZM, HZK and Io Shirai to win the Artist of Stardom Championship. Following the match, Hojo confirmed her impending departure from Stardom, without specifically mentioning WWE. Sane had contemplated retirement due to her age and injuries, but decided to go wrestle overseas after consulting Bull Nakano. The following day, Threedom reunited for one final match together, defeating Hiromi Mimura, HZK and Jungle Kyona in a six-woman tag team match. Hojo's one-year reign as the Wonder of Stardom Champion ended on May 14, when she lost the title to Mayu Iwatani in her ninth title defense, falling one defense short of tying Santana Garrett's record for most defenses. Hojo wrestled her final matches for Stardom on June 4. After Hojo, Mimura and Konami lost the Artist of Stardom Championship back to AZM, HZK and Shirai in their second defense, Hojo wrestled an unadvertised ten-match one-minute time limit series against members of the Stardom roster that ended in three wins, six draws and one loss.

WWE

Signing and Mae Young Classic (2016–2017) 
In October 2016, Housako was contacted and offered a WWE contract, starting the following year. Reportedly, Housako had stated that she was interested in going to WWE, but had not made a final decision yet. There were also questions over whether she could pass the company's physical examination due to her two concussions during the past two years. In March 2017, Housako signed a three-year contract with WWE, reportedly for $60,000 per year, which was less than she was making in Japan.

On June 30, a video at a WWE house show in Tokyo, introduced Housako as "Kairi Sane" to WWE's developmental division, NXT, as well as the upcoming Mae Young Classic tournament. On July 13, she defeated Tessa Blanchard in the tournament's first round in her WWE debut match. The following day, Sane first defeated Bianca Belair in the second round, then Dakota Kai in quarterfinals and finally Toni Storm in the semifinals to advance to the finals of the tournament. Reportedly, Sane suffered both a concussion and a neck injury during the tapings. On September 12, Sane defeated Shayna Baszler in the tournament finals and thereby earned a shot at the vacant NXT Women's Championship at the next NXT TakeOver show.

NXT Women's Champion (2017–2019) 

In October 2017, Sane made her television debut on NXT, defeating Aliyah. In November, at NXT TakeOver: WarGames, Sane competed in a fatal four–way match for the vacant NXT Women's Championship. but was unsuccessful as Ember Moon won the match.

On January 28, 2018, at the Royal Rumble, Sane participated in the first women's Royal Rumble match, entering at number 6 and lasting around 5 minutes before being eliminated by Dana Brooke. A few months later, she also participated in the WrestleMania Women's Battle Royal at WrestleMania 34, alongside other NXT superstars, but was eliminated from the match by Sasha Banks. Shortly after, Sane started a feud with Lacey Evans as the two exchanged victories and attacked each other throughout the next few weeks. Eventually, Sane was able to defeat Evans on the June 6 episode of NXT, in a final match between the two, to end their feud.

In July, after she defeated Candice LeRae and Nikki Cross in a triple–threat match to become the number one contender, Sane reignited her rivalry with Shayna Baszler, as the two exchanged victories in the Mae Young Classic Finals and at NXT and faced off in a match at NXT TakeOver: Brooklyn IV on August 18 where Sane was able to defeat Bazsler to win the NXT Women's Championship for the first time in her career. On October 28, at the WWE Evolution pay–per–view, Sane lost the championship back to Baszler (after interference from her allies Jessamyn Duke and Marina Shafir) ending her reign at 71 days. Three weeks later, at NXT TakeOver: WarGames, Sane received her rematch against Baszler in a two out of three falls match, but she failed to regain the title after interference from Duke and Shafir again. Because of the interferences, Sane eventually aligned with her best friend Io Shirai and Dakota Kai against Baszler, Duke and Shafir. Shortly after, Kai was sidelined with an injury and Sane continued to team with Shirai, forming a tag team known as "The Sky Pirates" while continuing to defeat various teams.

On April 5, 2019, at NXT TakeOver: New York, Sane competed in a fatal–four-way match for the NXT Women's Championship, however, she was unsuccessful in capturing the title as Baszler submitted Bianca Belair to retain. Just six days later, on April 11 (episode aired on tape delay on April 17), Sane lost a rematch to Baszler after Io Shirai attacked Baszler who was looking to injure Sane. Because of her loss, Sane is not allowed to challenge for the NXT Women's Championship anymore, which was a way to write her off the brand.

The Kabuki Warriors and WWE Ambassador (2019–2021) 

On the April 16, 2019, episode of SmackDown Live, Paige announced that she would be managing a newly formed women's tag team, consisting of Sane, who as a result was drafted to the main roster, and Asuka. The team of Sane and Asuka, later dubbed "The Kabuki Warriors", was immediately put in a feud with The IIconics (Billie Kay and Peyton Royce) over the WWE Women's Tag Team Championship. After weeks of avoiding them, The IIconics lost to The Kabuki Warriors during WWE's tour in Tokyo, which earned The Kabuki Warriors a title match. The title match took place on the July 16 episode of SmackDown, where The IIconics retained after they got themselves counted-out. In August, The Kabuki Warriors failed to capture the titles from then-champions Alexa Bliss and Nikki Cross.

After a short hiatus, The Kabuki Warriors returned in September and defeated Mandy Rose and Sonya Deville. On October 6 at the Hell in a Cell pay-per-view, The Kabuki Warriors finally won the Women's Tag Team Championship from Bliss and Cross, after Asuka used the green mist on Cross. The next night on Raw, The Kabuki Warriors completed their transition into heels, as they cut a promo on both Becky Lynch and Charlotte Flair and went onto defeat them in a non-title match after once again using green mist. As part of the 2019 Draft in mid-October, Asuka and Sane were both drafted to the Raw brand. On the October 28, 2019, episode of Raw, The Kabuki Warriors turned on Paige and used the green mist on her. That same night, Sane went one-on-one with Lynch, where she lost by submission. Asuka and Sane made their returns to NXT on the October 30 episode to defend the WWE Women's Tag Team Championship against Team Kick (Dakota Kai and Tegan Nox); marking the first time the titles were defended on NXT where they retained. On the November 4 episode of Raw, The Kabuki Warriors lost to Flair and Natalya when Asuka submitted to Natalya. The following week, Sane and Asuka retained their titles against Lynch and Flair following interference from Shayna Baszler and Bayley.

Sane represented Team Raw at Survivor Series in a 5-on-5-on-5 elimination tag team match, being eliminated by Sasha Banks. On December 1 at Starrcade, The Kabuki Warriors successfully retained the tag team titles against Becky Lynch and Charlotte Flair, Alexa Bliss and Nikki Cross and Bayley and Sasha Banks when Asuka submitted Cross. On the December 2 episode of Raw, Sane and Asuka defeated Flair in a handicap match. The following week on Raw, Sane and Asuka lost to Lynch by disqualification when Asuka attacked Becky with a chair, and Sane performed an  Insane Elbow on Lynch through a table. Sane and Asuka subsequently challenged Lynch and Flair to a WWE Women's Tag Team title match at TLC: Tables, Ladders & Chairs, which they accepted. At the event, The Kabuki Warriors retained their titles against Lynch and Flair in a Tables, Ladders and Chairs match; during the match, Sane suffered a legitmate concussion, which caused the remainder of the match to be changed on the fly. Following TLC, Sane would accompany Asuka on the entrance stage during a segment between Asuka and Lynch but didn't go to ringside with Asuka during her matches. Sane made her TV return on the January 20 episode of Raw, losing to Lynch by submission. On the March 2 episode of Raw, she returned to the ring in a losing effort against Shayna Baszler. On the first night of WrestleMania 36, The Kabuki Warriors lost their Women's Tag Team Championships to the team of Alexa Bliss and Nikki Cross, ending their reign at 181 days, the longest reign for the titles so far.

On the May 11, 2020, episode of Raw, then-Raw Women's Champion Becky Lynch vacated her title in order to take maternity leave, revealing that Asuka won the championship the night before by winning the Money in the Bank ladder match at the eponymous event. On the next episode of Raw, after Lynch's announcement, Sane was seen backstage with some of the other wrestlers congratulating Lynch, thus turning The Kabuki Warriors face as Sane celebrated Asuka's championship victory before being interrupted by Nia Jax, thus beginning a feud. On the June 6 episode of Raw, which was taped on May and aired on tape delay, Sane suffered a significant head cut. Sane made her televised return since her injury on the July 6 episode of Raw, as she challenged Sasha Banks in a match that ended in a disqualification due to Bayley's interference. Weeks after, The Kabuki Warriors unsuccessfully challenged Banks and Bayley for the WWE Women's Tag Team Championship. On the July 20 episode of Raw, she defeated SmackDown Women's Champion Bayley in a non-title match. The following week on Raw, Sane was viciously assaulted by Bayley backstage during the Raw Women's Championship match between Asuka and Banks. This was done to write her out of the storylines as Sane announced her departure from WWE on Twitter as she was heading back to Japan to be with her husband. WWE later confirmed Sane's departure on their website. On July 29, 2020, WWE's YouTube channel released a video chronicling Sane's last week in WWE. The video features Sane saying her goodbyes to everyone in WWE as she prepares to go back to Japan with superstars such as Asuka, Shinsuke Nakamura and Akira Tozawa all wishing her well.

On October 2, 2020, Sane announced that she had started working as an ambassador and trainer for WWE's branch in her native Japan. On October 25, she was part of the Japanese-language commentary team for the Hell in a Cell pay-per-view. In December 2021, she left WWE after her contract expired.

Return to World Wonder Ring Stardom (2022–present) 

On February 18, 2022, Housako made her return to Stardom; going by the ring name Kairi. Her in-ring return was at World Climax event in March. At World Climax: The Best, she teamed with Mayu Iwatani and defeated Cosmic Angels (Tam Nakano and Unagi Sayaka) in a tag team match. At World Climax: The Top, she defeated Starlight Kid. She ruptured her eardrum during the match and revealed the injury in a post-match interview. She made her return on May 28 at Stardom Flashing Champions, where she teamed with Tam Nakano as "White Knights" to defeat Queen's Quest (Utami Hayashishita and Miyu Amasaki) in a tag team match.

New Japan Pro-Wrestling (2022–present) 
In November 2022, Kairi defeated Mayu Iwatani in the main event of Historic X-Over, a professional wrestling event co-promoted by Stardom and its sister promotion New Japan Pro-Wrestling (NJPW), to become the inaugural IWGP Women's Champion. In 2023, Kairi defended her title against Tam Nakano at Wrestle Kingdom 17. After the match, she was confronted and attacked by Mercedes Moné (formerly known as Sasha Banks). Moné then challenged Kairi to a title match at Battle in the Valley. At the event, Kairi was defeated by Moné; ending her reign at 90 days.

Legacy 
In 2016, Dave Meltzer of the Wrestling Observer Newsletter referred to Kairi Hojo and her fellow Japanese wrestlers Io Shirai and Mayu Iwatani as "three of the best wrestlers in the world".

Other media 
Kairi Sane made her video game debut as a playable character in WWE 2K19. She is also a playable character in WWE 2K20.

Personal life 
Kairi married on February 22, 2020.

Filmography

Film 
 2012:

Television 
 2011: 
 2012: 
 2012: 
 2013: 
 2014: 
 2015:

Championships and accomplishments 

 New Japan Pro-Wrestling
 IWGP Women's Championship (1 time, inaugural)
 IWGP Women's Championship Tournament (2022)
 Pro Wrestling Illustrated
 Ranked No. 10 of the top 100 female wrestlers in the PWI Women's 100 in 2017 and 2018
 Ranked No. 9 of the top 50 tag teams in the PWI Tag Team 50 in 2020 
 Sports Illustrated
 Ranked No. 8 in the top 10 women's wrestlers in 2018 – 
 World Wonder Ring Stardom
 Artist of Stardom Championship (4 times) – with Kaori Yoneyama and Yuhi (1), Chelsea and Koguma (1), Io Shirai and Mayu Iwatani (1), and Hiromi Mimura and Konami (1)
 Goddess of Stardom Championship (3 times) – with Natsumi Showzuki (1), Nanae Takahashi (1), and Yoko Bito (1)
 Wonder of Stardom Championship (1 time)
 World of Stardom Championship (1 time)
 World of Stardom Championship tournament (2015)
 5★Star GP (2015)
 Goddesses of Stardom Tag League (2016) – with Yoko Bito
 5★Star GP Award (1 time)
 5★Star GP Best Match Award (2014) vs. Nanae Takahashi on August 24
 Stardom Year-End Award (7 times)
 Best Match Award (2014) with Nanae Takahashi vs. Risa Sera and Takumi Iroha on December 23
 Best Tag Team Award (2014) with Nanae Takahashi
 Best Tag Team Award (2016) with Yoko Bito
 Best Technique Award (2016)
 MVP Award (2015)
 Outstanding Performance Award (2013, 2015)
 WWE
 NXT Women's Championship (1 time)
 WWE Women's Tag Team Championship (1 time) – with Asuka
 Mae Young Classic (2017)
 NXT Year-End Award (2 times)
 Female Competitor of the Year (2018)
 Overall Competitor of the Year (2018)
 WWE Year-End Award (1 time)
 Women's Tag Team of the Year (2019) – with Asuka

References

External links 

 
 
 
 
 
 

1988 births
Living people
Japanese female professional wrestlers
Sportspeople from Yamaguchi Prefecture
Masked wrestlers
Japanese actresses
Japanese female sailors (sport)
NXT Women's Champions
21st-century professional wrestlers
WWE Women's Tag Team Champions
World of Stardom Champions
Wonder of Stardom Champions
Goddess of Stardom Champions
Artist of Stardom Champions
IWGP Women's Champions